The Schwarze Röder is a river of Saxony, Germany. It is a left tributary of the Große Röder, which it joins in Radeberg.

See also
List of rivers of Saxony

Rivers of Saxony
Rivers of Germany